Altica tamaricis is a species of flea beetle from the family of leaf beetles, that can be found in Europe.

Subspecies
The species bears two subspecies:
Altica tamaricis franzi (Kral, 1966)
Altica tamaricis tamaricis Schrank, 1785

References

Beetles described in 1785
Beetles of Europe
Alticini
Taxa named by Franz von Paula Schrank